Coherence scanning interferometry (CSI) is any of a class of optical surface measurement methods wherein the localization of interference fringes during a scan of optical path length provides a means to determine surface characteristics such as topography, transparent film structure, and optical properties.  CSI is currently the most common interference microscopy technique for  areal surface topography measurement.  The term "CSI" was adopted by the International Organization for Standardization (ISO).
 
The technique encompasses but is not limited to instruments that use spectrally broadband, visible sources (white light) to achieve interference fringe localization.  CSI uses either fringe localization alone or in combination with interference fringe phase, depending on the surface type, desired surface topography repeatability and software capabilities.  The table below compiles alternative terms that conform at least in part to the above definition.

References 

Interferometry
Optical instruments